Enrico Ardizzoia (born 29 June 1917) was a Swiss footballer who played for FC Basel as a forward.

Ardizzoia joined Basel's first team in 1934. He played his domestic league debut for the club in the home game at the Landhof on 7 April 1935 as Basel drew 2–2 against Young Fellows Zürich.

Between the years 1934 and 1942 Ardizzoia played ten games for Basel scoring one goal. Four of these games were in the Nationalliga and six were friendly games. He scored his only goal in the test game on 17 August 1941 against Luzern.

References

Sources
 Rotblau: Jahrbuch Saison 2017/2018. Publisher: FC Basel Marketing AG. 
 Die ersten 125 Jahre. Publisher: Josef Zindel im Friedrich Reinhardt Verlag, Basel. 
 Verein "Basler Fussballarchiv" Homepage

FC Basel players
Swiss men's footballers
Association football forwards
1917 births
Year of death missing